The bicolored scrubwren or bicolored mouse-warbler (Aethomyias nigrorufus) is a species of bird in the family Acanthizidae. It is found in the New Guinea Highlands ; its natural habitat is subtropical or tropical moist montane forests.

This species was formerly placed in the genus Crateroscelis but following the publication of a molecular phylogenetic study of the scrubwrens and mouse-warblers in 2018, it was moved to the resurrected genus Aethomyias.

References

External links

Image at ADW 

bicolored scrubwren
bicolored scrubwren
Taxonomy articles created by Polbot
Taxobox binomials not recognized by IUCN